"Good Times" (aka "Gonna Have a Good Time") is a song by the Easybeats which was released as a single in Australia 18 July 1968, and which appeared on their Vigil album with guest vocals by Steve Marriott of Small Faces. It was written by George Young and Harry Vanda.

When broadcast on BBC radio it was reputedly heard by Paul McCartney on his car radio; McCartney apparently rang the station immediately to request a repeat playing.

Notable cover versions

The Clingers 
"Good Times" was recorded and released in 1969 as "Gonna Have a Good Time Tonight" by four Mormon sisters from Utah. The song was produced by Kim Fowley for Columbia Records but failed to chart. The Clingers are regarded as the first all female rock band that played their own instruments.

[reference re producer Kim Fowley https://www.allmusic.com/artist/the-clinger-sisters-mn0001789017 ]
[reference re 'First Girls of Rock 'n' Roll' https://www.amazon.com.au/Clinger-Sisters-First-Girl-Rock/dp/B00FKN1E5M ]

Shocking Blue 
"Good Times" was covered by Dutch rock band Shocking Blue, on their eighth and final album released in 1974.

Quartz 
The NWOBHM heavy metal band Quartz released a live cover version of this song on their 1980 released live album Live Quartz. In 2013 the band also released a studio version of the song on their self-produced compilation Back in the Band – Live and Revisited.

INXS & Jimmy Barnes 
Australians INXS and Jimmy Barnes released a version in December 1986, which was engineered by Al Wright and appeared in the Joel Schumacher film The Lost Boys. This version reached number one in New Zealand and number two in Australia, as well as obtaining chart positions in the US (where it peaked at number 47), Canada (number 74), and UK (where it peaked at number 18 in 1991). A video clip was produced featuring INXS and Jimmy Barnes performing the song, with scenes intercut from The Lost Boys. This version was also used to promote the national Australian Made series of concerts that took place between Boxing Day 1986 and Australia Day 1987.

Barnes later said, "We spent a day and a half in the studio. Michael Hutchence and myself didn't sleep the whole time we were there. It was a booze- and drug-fuelled couple of days."

Australian Idol 2004 cover 
The song was performed on the Top 12 Results Show of the second season of Australian Idol in 2004. This version of the song was then released by the Top 10 finalists nearly four months after the live show. It was released as a one-track CD single and reached a peak of #53 on the ARIA singles chart.

Meat Loaf cover version 
"Good Times" was covered by the American rock singer Meat Loaf on his 1995 album Welcome to the Neighbourhood. This new version, credited to Vanda/Young/Durkee/Loaf/Russo, was titled "Runnin' for the Red Light (I Got a Life)" and featured significantly different lyrics.

Hindu Love Gods cover version 
Hindu Love Gods covered the song on a 1986 single, but under the title "Gonna Have a Good Time Tonight". The members of Hindu Love Gods were Mike Mills, Bill Berry and Peter Buck of R.E.M., Bryan Cook, and Warren Zevon. The 7" single was released on I.R.S. Records.

Jimmy Barnes featuring Keith Urban 
Jimmy Barnes reprised the song on his 30:30 Hindsight release in 2014, with Keith Urban on guitar and vocals

Jessica Mauboy version 
Jessica Mauboy covered the song on her 2016 album, The Secret Daughter: Songs from the Original TV Series.

Charts

The Easybeats version

INXS/Jimmy Barnes version

Year-end charts

Australian Idol version

References 

1968 singles
INXS songs
1986 singles
The Easybeats songs
Jimmy Barnes songs
Songs written by Harry Vanda
Songs written by George Young (rock musician)
1967 songs
Parlophone singles
United Artists Records singles
Mushroom Records singles
Song recordings produced by Glyn Johns
Number-one singles in New Zealand